The 1899 Osgoldcross by-election was a parliamentary by-election  for the House of Commons constituency of Osgoldcross in the West Riding of Yorkshire held on 5 July 1899.

Vacancy
The by-election was caused by the resignation of the sitting Liberal MP, Sir John Austin. Austin had been MP for Osgoldcross  since 1886 but he found himself in dispute with his constituency Liberal Association when he voted against certain measures in Parliament which were supported by the Liberal Party nationally. Some of these issues were on religious questions and Sir John Austin was a Roman Catholic. In some quarters the dispute with Sir John Austin was seen as an attack on him because of his religion, although he had a record of getting on well with his traditionally nonconformist constituency.  However one of the issues that Austin championed was opposing the power of local authorities to impose a veto on liquor sales and this brought him into conflict with many of his pro-temperance chapel Liberals. A meeting of the Osgoldcoss Liberal Association was held at Pontefract on 15 June 1899 and a vote of no confidence in Austin was passed. A further motion of regret at his actions was also passed but, no doubt in an effort to heal the breach between MP and local party, it was declared that Austin had broken no pledges made in his election addresses.

Candidates

Austin

Following the vote of censure against him Sir John Austin decided to resign his seat and appeal directly to his constituents on the points at issue. He chose to contest the election as a Liberal and was sometimes also referred to in the press as a Radical. However, in view of his breach with the official party Austin is referred to here as an Independent Liberal.

Liberals

The local Liberal Association were divided in loyalty, with some believing Austin’s record required their support. A meeting at Castleford on 23 June 1899, chaired by Mr Arthur Hartley the chairman of Osgoldcross Liberals, at which Austin declared himself to be a loyal supporter of Liberal leader Sir Henry Campbell-Bannerman, selected Austin as Liberal candidate to fight the by-election. However another meeting of Liberals at Pontefract the same day adopted Charles Henry Roberts, the son-in-law of Lady Carlisle, as an Independent Liberal or Radical to contest the seat and this decision was endorsed by a further mass meeting at the Market Hall at Goole later that night, chaired by the president of the Osgoldcross Liberals, Frederick Andrews. Roberts declared that he supported the entire Liberal programme as formulated by William Ewart Gladstone and the meeting endorsed his candidacy saying they wanted a man who was a Liberal “all along the line”. He also described himself as the Local Veto (i.e. pro-temperance) candidate. For this reason, Roberts is described  here as the official Liberal candidate.

Others

There had been a history of contested elections in Osgoldcross in recent years. In 1885 there had been a Conservative candidate. However this time, perhaps preferring not to intrude on the private grief of the Liberal Party, no other party put forward a candidate to take advantage of the Liberal split.

The result
Sir John Austin retained his seat by a clear and comfortable majority, increasing his majority from 1,065 to 2,925, having obtained well over 50% of the poll.

The votes

See also
List of United Kingdom by-elections
United Kingdom by-election records

References

1899 elections in the United Kingdom
1899 in England
By-elections to the Parliament of the United Kingdom in West Yorkshire constituencies
By-elections to the Parliament of the United Kingdom in North Yorkshire constituencies
19th century in Yorkshire
July 1899 events